Jarnéia Richard-Noel (born 12 June 1994) is an English stage actress and singer. She is known for portraying the role of Catherine of Aragon in the musical Six on the original UK tour and in the West End production at the Arts Theatre, Lyric Theatre and Vaudeville Theatre, as well as forming part of pop girl group SVN.

Early life 
Richard-Noel grew up in Northampton, and has attended dance school since she was five and continued her love for arts into college. Richard-Noel then started training at the Urdang Academy in Islington, London for a National Diploma in Professional Musical Theatre in 2014 for three years until she graduated in 2017. She is also of Grenadian and Trinbagonian decent.

Career 
Prior to making her professional debut as a singer and dancer on board a P&O cruise, Richard-Noel performed in a number of productions whilst training at the Urdang Academy in Islington, London for a National Diploma in Professional Musical Theatre. She first starred in a theatrical production of Shakespeare Shorts at the Urdang Academy in 2016, and starred in subsequent productions held at the same venue, including Co-Equal, Spamalot, Carrie and Rent. Richard-Noel also starred in both a one-off concert titled 'Xmas Factor' for Iris Theatre in reference to The X Factor in 2016, and a concert rendition of The Color Purple as an ensemble member in 2017. She also was a commercial dancer for Vanarama Commercial during 2018. 

Richard-Noel has been a company member of Six since 2018, playing the role of Catherine of Aragon. The production toured the UK before finally returning to the Arts Theatre, in the originally staged production (before it transferred to the new production at the Lyric Theatre). She received a Laurence Olivier Award for Best Actress in a Supporting Role in a Musical nomination alongside principal cast colleagues Millie O'Connell, Natalie Paris, Alexia McIntosh, Aimie Atkinson and Maiya Quansah-Breed in 2019. From 2019 to 2021 she worked alongside principal cast colleagues Courtney Bowman, Natalie Paris, Alexia McIntosh, Sophie Isaacs and Danielle Steers. Richard-Noel was also due to feature in a Live Drive-In UK Tour of Six presented by Utilita Energy, in association with Live Nation. The performances were due to take place in compliance with the HM Government's COVID-19 social distancing measures at various venues across the UK. However, promoters Live Nation announced the cancellation of the tour due to fears over potential localised lockdowns in response to the ongoing coronavirus pandemic. Richard-Noel performed as part of the principal cast of Six at the Lyric Theatre, as one of the first musicals to return to the West End after the COVID-19 pandemic. From late September 2021, Richard-Noel moved to the nearby Vaudeville Theatre to complete her run in Six until her final performance as Catherine of Aragon on 14 November 2021. In July 2022, It was announced that Jarnéia would star in Elliot Clay's new musical Millennials until the end of its run at The Other Palace.

Theatre credits

SVN 
Richard-Noel also forms a part of the pop girl group SVN (pronounced 'seven') alongside five former West End cast members of Six: Millie O'Connell, Natalie May Paris, Alexia McIntosh, Aimie Atkinson and Maiya Quansah-Breed, plus Grace Mouat from the cast of Max Martin musical & Juliet, and former swing of the original cast of Six. After a limited series of concerts in October 2020, their debut concert was rescheduled from February 2022 to 7 August 2022 at the O2 Academy Islington, with the group releasing singles such as "Stars" and "Free" in 2022.

Discography

Concerts

Filmography

Television

Radio

References

Living people
1994 births
21st-century English actresses
21st-century English singers
21st-century English women singers
Actors from Northamptonshire
Black British actresses
English musical theatre actresses
English people of Grenadian descent
English people of Trinidad and Tobago descent
English stage actresses
Musicians from Northamptonshire
People from Northampton